The 2011 Euro Beach Soccer League (EBSL) is an annual European competition in beach soccer. The competitions allows national teams to compete in beach soccer in a league format over the summer months. Each season ends with a Superfinal, deciding the competition winner.

There are seven teams participating in two divisions in each Stage (there are four Stages) that will face each other in a round-robin system. Division A consists of the 8 top teams in Europe based on the BSWW European Ranking. Division B consists of the lower ranked teams and new entries to the competition. Each division has its own regulations and competition format.

Each team competes in two preliminary events to see their points obtained accumulated into an overall ranking that will determine the teams that qualify for the Superfinal. The top five teams of Division A (including the individual Stage winners) plus the host team Russia play in the Superfinal in Moscow (Russia) from August 26–29. The top five teams of Division B (including the individual Stage winners) plus the worst team in Division A will play in the Promotional Final to try to earn promotion to Division A for the 2012 season.

Teams

Stage 1 Bern, Switzerland – May, 27 – 29

Participating nations 

 
 
 
 
 
 
 

It had been earlier announced that Hungary would be the third team participating in Division B.

Final standings Division A

Final standings Division B

Schedule and results 
All kickoff times are of local time in Bern (UTC+02:00).

Individual awards 
MVP: Juanma Lima
Top Scorer: Giuseppe Soria — 5 goals
Best goalkeeper: Simone Del Mestre

Stage 2 Berlin, Germany – July, 8 – 10

Participating nations

Final standings Division A

Final standings Division B

Schedule and results 
All kickoff times are of local time in Berlin (UTC+02:00).

Individual awards 
MVP: Dmitry Shishin
Top Scorer: Dmitry Shishin — 7 goals
Best goalkeeper: Andrey Bukhlitskiy

Stage 3 Ravenna, Italy – July, 22 – 24

Participating nations

Final standings Division A

Final standings Division B

Schedule and results 
All kickoff times are of local time in Ravenna (UTC+02:00).

Individual awards 
MVP: Maci
Top Scorer: Boguslaw Saganowski and Dejan Stankovic — 5 goals
Best goalkeeper: Simone Del Mestre

Stage 4 Den Haag (The Hague), Netherlands – July, 29 – 31

Participating nations

Final standings Division A

Final standings Division B

Schedule and results 
All kickoff times are of local time in The Hague (UTC+02:00).

Individual awards 
MVP: Egor Shaykov
Top Scorer: Belchior — 6 goals
Best goalkeeper: Xan

Cumulative standings

Division A

Division B 

Netherlands are ranked ahead of Israel based on fair play points

EBSL Superfinal and Promotional Final – Moscow, Russia – August, 4 – 7

Superfinal and Promotional Final Divisions 

The Divisions for the Euro Beach Soccer League Superfinal have been determined. The teams from Division A will compete for the Euro Beach Soccer League title while the teams from Division B will compete for promotion into next year's Division A.

Division A (Superfinal)

Group A Standings

Group B Standings

Schedule and results 
All kickoff times are of local time in Moscow (UTC+04:00).

Round-Robin

Fifth-place Match

Third-place Match

Championship final match

Individual awards 
MVP: Dmitry Shishin
Top Scorer: Dejan Stankovic — 7 goals
Best goalkeeper: Valentin Jaeggy

Final Division A Standing

Division B (Promotional Final)

Group A Standings

Group B Standings

Schedule and results 
All kickoff times are of local time in Moscow (UTC+04:00).

Round-Robin

Fifth-place Match

Third-place Match

Promotional Final Match

Final Division B Standing

See also 
 Beach soccer
 Euro Beach Soccer League

References

External links 
 Beach Soccer Worldwide
 Eurosport TV
 Crocs Europe Beach Soccer

Euro Beach Soccer League
2011 in beach soccer